Wiegmann's tree lizard (Anisolepis undulatus) is a species of lizard in the family Leiosauridae. The species is endemic to South America.

Geographic range
A. undulatus is found in Argentina, Brazil, and Uruguay.

Habitat
The natural habitat of A. undulatus is temperate forests.

Reproduction
A. undulatus is oviparous.

Conservation status
A. undulatus is threatened by habitat loss.

Taxonomy and etymology
The junior synonym, Anisolepis iheringii, is the type species of the genus Anisolepis. The specific name, iheringii, is in honor of German-Brazilian zoologist Hermann von Ihering.

References

Further reading
Boulenger GA (1886). "A Synopsis of the Reptiles and Batrachians of the Province Rio Grande do Sul, Brazil". Ann. Mag. Nat. Hist., Fifth Series 18: 423–445. (Anisolepis undulatus, new combination, p. 426).
Etheridge R, Williams EE (1991). "A Review of the South American Lizard Genera Urostrophus and Anisolepis (Squamata: Iguania: Polychridae)". Bull. Mus. Comp. Zool. 152 (5): 317–361. (Anisolepis undulatus, pp. 339–344, Figures 7–10).
Wiegmann AFA (1834). Herpetologia Mexicana, seu descriptio amphibiorum Novae Hispaniae, quae itineribus comitis de Sack, Ferdinandi Deppe et Chr. Guil. Schiede in Museum Zoologicum Berolinense pervenerunt. Pars prima, saurorum species amplectens. Adiecto systematis saurorum prodromo, additisque multis in hunc amphibiorum ordinen observationibus. Berlin: C.G. Lüderitz. vi + 54 pp. + Plates I-X. (Laemanctus undulatus, new species, p. 46). (in Latin).

undulatus
Lizards of South America
Reptiles of Argentina
Reptiles of Brazil
Reptiles of Uruguay
Taxonomy articles created by Polbot
Reptiles described in 1834
Taxa named by Arend Friedrich August Wiegmann